Ayatollah Abbas Ka'bi Nasab (Persian: آیت الله عباس کعبی) is an Iranian Twelver Shi'a cleric who was born in Ahwaz in 1962 into a religious family. Records mention that he is one of the 12 members of the Guardian Council of the Islamic Republic of Iran, a member of the Society of Seminary Teachers of Qom, a professor of a university, a member and the vice-president of the security committee of the Assembly of Experts for Leadership, and other significant positions.

Education
Ayatollah Ka’bi went to Ahwaz seminary in 1976, then immigrated to Qom in 1985 and finished his Islamic education, and later, he participated in the classes of famous scholars and ayatollahs, such as Makeram Shirazi, Hossein Vahid Khorasani, Safi Golpaygani, Ja'far Sobhani, and so on.

Kaabi frequently gives speeches in Arabic.

Positions
In 2018, Kaabi gave a speech in Arabic in which he said, "Moving the U.S. embassy in the Zionist entity from Tel Aviv to Jerusalem undoubtedly constitutes a new Balfour declaration."

In 2022, he said: "Israel is sending medical delegations to some Persian Gulf littoral states for a biological war against Islamic Ummah through gaining control over DNA of Muslim nations".

In 2022, he advocated for the death penalty for the protesters during Iranian_protests.

In a December 2022 Arabic speech, Kaabi decried the death of “martyr” Abu Mahdi Al-Muhandis while promising vengeance.

Works 
Abbas Ka'abi has written several books, such as:
 Al-Hasilah fi Hokm Al-Jahad Al-Ebtedaye fi Asre Al-Gheibat
 Feqh Al-Alaghat Al-Dovaliah fi Al-Islam
 Falsafeye Hoqooq
 Mardomsalary Dini
 Hoqooqe Asasi
 Hoqooqe Beinolmelale Islami
 Mosader Al-Hadis
 Azadi va Din, Azadi va Edalat
 Ahkam Al-Mayet
 Derase fi Elm Al-Hadis
 Zemanathaye Ejraee Ghanoone Asasi
 MardomSalarie Dini
 Ejraye Amalieh Hodud Wa Ejraye aan

References and notes

External links 

Iranian ayatollahs
Living people
Members of the Guardian Council
Members of the Assembly of Experts
Society of Seminary Teachers of Qom members
1962 births